Mossview Plantation was a medium-sized cotton plantation of  located in Leon County, Florida, United States established by Amos Whitehead.

Location
Mossview Plantation was located in north central Leon County on the southeast shore of Lake Jackson and just north of Live Oak Plantation

Plantation specifics
The Leon County Florida 1860 Agricultural Census shows that Mossview Plantation had the following:
 Improved Land: 
 Unimproved Land: 
 Cash value of plantation: $20,000
 Cash value of farm implements/machinery: $800
 Cash value of farm animals: $3600
 Number of slaves: 58
 Bushels of corn: 2000
 Bales of cotton: 80

The Owner
Amos Whitehead was from Burke County, Georgia. On June 18, 1858, he married Miss Margaret M. Bradford, daughter of Dr. Edward Bradford of Pine Hill Plantation at Pine Hill. The Rev. Dr. Nash officiated.

In 1915 Mossview would become Meridian Plantation having been sold to Arthur B. Lapsley of Pomfret, Connecticut.

References
Rootsweb Plantations
Paisley, Clifton; From Cotton To Quail, University of Florida Press, c1968.
Rootsweb - Amos Whitehead

Plantations in Leon County, Florida
Cotton plantations in Florida